Spirostachys is a plant genus of the family Euphorbiaceae first described as a genus in 1850. It is native to Africa. Zuloaga, F. O., O. Morrone, M. J. Belgrano, C. Marticorena & E. Marchesi. (eds.) 2008. Catálogo de las plantas vasculares del Cono Sur. Monographs in systematic botany from the Missouri Botanical Garden  107(1–3): i–xcvi, 1–3348.

The genus name is derived from Ancient Greek speiros = spiral, stachys = spike, in allusion to the spiral arrangement of the florets on the flower spike.

Species
 Spirostachys africana Sond. - E + SE + S Africa (Kenya, Tanzania, Mozambique, Angola, Zimbabwe, Botswana, Namibia, Swaziland, Limpopo, Mpumalanga, KwaZulu-Natal, Cape Province) 
 Spirostachys venenifera (Pax) Pax  - Somalia, Kenya, Tanzania

formerly included
moved to other genera (Excoecaria Spegazziniophytum )
 Spirostachys madagascariensis, syn of Excoecaria madagascariensis 
 Spirostachys patagonica, syn of Spegazziniophytum patagonicum

names in Amaranthaceae
The same genus name, Spirostachys, was used twice to name genera in the Amaranthaceae. Thus were created two illegitimate homonyms, unacceptable according to the rules of nomenclature. The species assigned to these genera have been placed in the genera Allenrolfea and Heterostachys,  as follows:
 Spirostachys occidentalis (S. Watson) S. Watson 1874, now Allenrolfea occidentalis (S.Watson) Kuntze 
 Spirostachys olivascens Speg. 1902, now Heterostachys olivascens (Speg.) Molfino
 Spirostachys ritteriana (Moq.) Ung.-Sternb. 1866, now  Heterostachys ritteriana (Moq.) Ung.-Sternb.
 Spirostachys vaginata Griseb. 1874, now Allenrolfea vaginata (Griseb.) Kuntze 
 Spirostachys vaginata Benth. & Hook.f. - unresolved

References

Hippomaneae
Flora of Africa
Euphorbiaceae genera